1976, also known as Chile 76 in North America, is a 2022 Chilean-Argentine drama film directed by Manuela Martelli in her directorial debut, with a screenplay co-written by Martelli and Alejandra Moffat. The film premiered on May 26, 2022, in the Directors' Fortnight section at the Cannes Film Festival and was released in Chilean cinemas on October 20, 2022. It was nominated in the Best Ibero-American Film category at the 37th Goya Awards.

Plot 
Carmen, a 50-year-old housewife from a middle-class family, enjoys a comfortable life in Santiago with her successful and respected doctor husband Miguel and their adult children. In the winter of 1976, three years after Augusto Pinochet seized power in Chile through a coup and established a military dictatorship, Carmen travels to her summer house to oversee renovation work and take some time for herself. While there, Father Sánchez, the priest of the small coastal town, asks for her help in caring for Elías, a young man who is part of the resistance against the dictator, has been wounded by a bullet, and has taken refuge with him. Because Carmen has medical knowledge and had once aspired to study medicine herself, and has also been involved in charitable projects in the church, she agrees to assist.

Cast 
 Aline Kuppenheim as Carmen
 Nicolás Sepúlveda as Elías
 Hugo Medina as Father Sánchez
 Alejandro Goic as Miguel
 Carmen Gloria Martínez as Estela
 Antonia Zegers as Raquel
 Marcial Tagle as Osvaldo
 Amalia Kassai as Leonor
 Gabriel Urzúa as Tomás
 Luis Cerda as Pedro
 Ana Clara Delfino as Clara
 Elena Delfino as Elenita

Production 
1976 was directed by Chilean filmmaker Manuela Martelli, who co-wrote the screenplay with Alejandra Moffat. Martelli had previously worked on the Chilean horror stop-motion animated film La casa lobo. With 1976, Martelli made her feature film directorial debut, while also having appeared in more than 15 films as an actress.

The film is set in 1976, the year when Martelli's maternal grandmother passed away, and she wanted to explore the experiences that told the story of a different reality through family videos shot with a Super-8 camera.

The lead role of the housewife Carmen is played by Aline Küppenheim, a Chilean theater, film, and television actress of French descent, considered one of the greatest performers in her home country. Küppenheim gained international recognition for her role in Sebastián Lelio's A Fantastic Woman. The film also stars Nicolás Sepúlveda, who plays the wounded man named Elías, and Hugo Medina, who plays Padre Sánchez.

Filming took place in the summer of 2021, partly in Las Cruces, a holiday resort in the Chilean coastal town/municipality of El Tabo in the Valparaíso region. Yarará Rodríguez served as the cinematographer, while the film's score was composed by Brazilian jazz and improvisational musician Mariá Portugal.

Release 
1976 premiered at the Cannes Film Festival in May 2022, where it was shown in the Directors' Fortnight section. It was also screened at several other film festivals, including the Melbourne International Film Festival, the San Sebastián International Film Festival, the Hamburg Film Festival, the Osnabrück Film Festival, the Chicago International Film Festival, the Tokyo International Film Festival, and the Palm Springs International Film Festival. The film is scheduled to be shown at the Göteborg International Film Festival and as part of the New Directors/New Films series in early 2023.

Awards

References

External links 

 
 1976 in Cinechile.

2022 films
2022 drama films
Chilean drama films
Argentine drama films
2020s Spanish-language films
2020s Argentine films
Films set in Chile
Films shot in Chile
Films about the Chilean military dictatorship
2022 directorial debut films
2020s Chilean films
Films set in 1976